Muhammed Mert (born 9 February 1995) is a Belgian professional football player who plays for Turkish club Hatayspor.

Career
Mert joined N.E.C. in 2014 from K.R.C. Genk. He made his professional debut on 22 August 2014 against Fortuna Sittard.

References

External links
 
 
 
 Voetbal International profile 

1995 births
Living people
Sportspeople from Hasselt
Footballers from Limburg (Belgium)
Belgian footballers
Belgium youth international footballers
Turkish footballers
Turkey youth international footballers
Belgian people of Turkish descent
NEC Nijmegen players
Fortuna Sittard players
Hatayspor footballers
Süper Lig players
TFF First League players
Eerste Divisie players
Association football midfielders